Ali Shamal Abdulla (born 21 March 1999) is a Maldivian professional footballer who plays as a right-back or centre-back for United Victory and Maldives national team.

Early life & club career
Shamal began playing football as a goalkeeper, in island level tournaments for the neighbourhood club, Dhoondigalona. He later had a brief trial at Maziya before playing for Dhoondigan as a back-up keeper for the 2015 Minivan Championship.

In 2016, he joined Club Eagles and played there three seasons before joining United Victory in 2020.

International career
On 4 June 2021, Shamal made his debut for the Maldives national team against Syria, replacing Hamza Mohamed in the 61st minute, becoming the first player from Fuvahmulah to represent the senior football team.

References

External links
 

1999 births
Living people
Maldivian footballers
Association football defenders
Maldives international footballers
Club Eagles players
United Victory players